Dedham (formerly Dedham Center) was a train station located in central Dedham, Massachusetts, at the terminus of the Dedham Branch.

Original station
The original Dedham station stood near the intersection of Eastern Avenue and High Streets. It opened in February 1835 with the rest of the Dedham Branch.  The depot bell was mounted on a tall post at the northeast corner on a projecting gooseneck arm. It was rung 10 minutes before a train was to leave, then again five minutes before, and for a final time at the train's departure. It burned down in 1849, leaving only the walls standing, and it was patched up with boards for temporary use until a new station could be constructed to the south.

New station
The station had a long colonnade of arches facing Eastern Avenue and it had a bell tower. A red covered bridge would rumble as trains would pass through it.

After April 1966, Dedham station, along with the rest of the Dedham Branch, was part of the MBTA Commuter Rail system; however, it closed just under a year later, putting an end to 132 years of uninterrupted train service to Dedham Square.

See also
 History of rail in Dedham, Massachusetts

References

Works cited

External links

1967 disestablishments in Massachusetts
1835 establishments in Massachusetts
MBTA Commuter Rail stations in Norfolk County, Massachusetts
Former MBTA stations in Massachusetts
Railway stations in the United States opened in 1835
Railway stations closed in 1967
Buildings and structures in Dedham, Massachusetts
Dedham Branch
Former New York, New Haven and Hartford Railroad stations
Railway stations in Dedham, Massachusetts